Sheffield Legends is a Walk of Fame located outside Sheffield Town Hall honouring famous people from or connected to Sheffield. As in the Hollywood version, there are plaques with famous people's names on them and why they are famous.

The idea was first suggested in 2005 when the people of Sheffield were asked who should be honoured after a local resident suggested honouring the footballer Gordon Banks, who grew up in Sheffield.

To date, the inductees are:

References

External links 
 Sheffield Legends

Legends
Walks of fame